Greußen is a Verwaltungsgemeinschaft ("collective municipality") in the district Kyffhäuserkreis, in Thuringia, Germany. The seat of the Verwaltungsgemeinschaft is in Greußen, itself not part of the Verwaltungsgemeinschaft.

The Verwaltungsgemeinschaft Greußen consists of the following municipalities:
Clingen
Niederbösa
Oberbösa
Topfstedt
Trebra
Wasserthaleben 
Westgreußen

References

Verwaltungsgemeinschaften in Thuringia